Barkeria uniflora is a species of orchids. It is found in central Mexico. It is the type species of its genus.

References

External links 

uniflora
Plants described in 1977
Orchids of Mexico